Elektracustika is the ninth studio album by Oficina G3, and the fourth released by MK Music. This album introduces new versions of old songs of the Oficina G3, and brings four new songs.

Track listing
 "Intro" - 0:56
 "Além do Que os Olhos Podem Ver" - 4:18 (from Além do que os olhos podem ver, 2005)
 "Desculpas" - 3:50 (from Humanos, 2002)
 "Mais Alto" - 4:08 (from Além do que os olhos podem ver, 2005)
 "Cura-me" - 3:49
 "Resposta de Deus" - 4:19 (from Nada é tão novo, Nada tão velho, 1993)
 "A Deus" - 5:01
 "Eu, Lázaro" - 4:57
 "Ele Vive" - 4:17 (from O Tempo, 2000)
 "Razão" - 4:08 (from Nada é tão novo, Nada tão velho, 1993)
 "Preciso Voltar" - 4:37 (from O Tempo, 2000)
 "A Lição" - 4:05 (from Além do que os olhos podem ver, 2005)
 "Deserto" - 4:31
 "Perfeito Amor" - 3:41 (from O Tempo, 2000)
 "Me Faz Ouvir" - 3:44

Personnel
 Juninho Afram: guitar, acoustic guitar, vocals
 Duca Tambasco: bass
 Jean Carllos: keyboard

References

External links
 Official Website
 MK Music Page

2007 albums
Oficina G3 albums